Carroll Senior High School (commonly known as Southlake Carroll) is a public secondary school in Southlake, Texas, serving students in grades 11 and 12. The school is part of the Carroll Independent School District, serving the majority of the city of Southlake, Texas and portions of northwest Grapevine, far northern Colleyville and eastern Westlake. The building is located at 1501 W.Southlake Blvd at the intersection of S.Peytonville Avenue and Southlake Blvd.

History
Carroll Senior High School was founded in 1919 as Carroll School, better known at the time as Carroll Hill School, and served students in grades 1-9. In 1959, Carroll became an Independent School District. In 1965, Carroll ISD was fully accredited for primary and secondary education. The original Carroll High School opened in 1970. In 1992, a new campus was opened and served grades 9–12 until the year 2000, when 9th grade was moved to Carroll Junior High School (now Carroll High School) to accommodate growth. In 2002, the school became a true "split campus" when Carroll Junior High School became Carroll High School, serving freshmen and sophomores, and Carroll High School became Carroll Senior High School, serving juniors and seniors.

Athletics
The Carroll Dragons have won 20 state titles since 1975, including titles in American football, wrestling, golf, cross country, swimming, baseball, soccer, basketball, diving, track and field, hockey, marching band, and lacrosse.

Carroll won the UIL Lone Star Cup in the 2000–01 and 2001–02 school years as a 4A school and in the 2011–12, 2012–13 and 2013–14 school years as a 5A school. Carroll has also won in 2014–15, 2018–19, and 2021-2022 as a 6A school.

Baseball
Baseball
 State Champs: (3A, 1982) (4A, 2002) (6A 2018, 2019, 2022)
 Runner-Up: (5A, 2008)
The 2018 Dragons beat San Antonio Reagan at Dell Diamond by a score of 7–2 on June 9, 2018, led by coach Larry Vucan, to win the UIL Class 6A State Championship. The dragons first State Championship since 2002 and finished 35–6 to end the season. Carroll finished with a perfect record of 11–0 during the playoffs in 2018. The 2020 season was canceled due to the COVID-19 pandemic. The Dragons were unable to make another run for a third consecutive state title. In 2022, the Dragons won a 3rd State Championship in 4 years, beating San Antonio Reagan 8-5. The Dragons head coach, Larry Vucan, has led the team to massive success since recently being named the head coach.

Football

Football
 State Champs: (3A, 1988, 1992, 1993) (5A II, 2002, 2004, 2005) (5A I, 2006, 2011) 
 Runner-Up: (5A II, 2003) (6A I, 2021)
As of 2017, The Dragons have an all-time record of 427–135–8. Head Coach Bob Ledbetter led the Dragons to statewide prominence with three 3A state titles in 1988, 1992 and 1993. His successor, Tom Rapp, compiled a 29–17–1 record as Carroll head coach from 1996–99 without a state finals appearance.

In 2000, the former University of Texas at Austin quarterback Todd Dodge replaced Rapp as head coach. In seven seasons, Dodge led the Dragons to a 98–11 record (including a 79–1 record and four state championships in the school's first five years as a Class 5A program), before leaving Carroll for the University of North Texas in 2007. His successor is Hal Wasson, former head coach at Fossil Ridge High School (Fort Worth, Texas). Carroll was recognized as United States High School Football National Champion in 2004, 2005, and 2006.

Carroll Senior High School played Miami Northwestern High School in a rare No. 1 versus No. 2 match at the Gerald J. Ford Stadium in Dallas, Texas, on September 15, 2007. The game was televised nationally by ESPNU. The Dragons were defeated 29–21, which ended their winning streak at 49, tying the Texas big-school state record set by Abilene HS from 1954 to 1957. On December 1, 2007, Southlake Carroll faced Abilene High School in the Regional semifinals. Carroll was defeated 22–21. In 2009, Carroll defeated Colleyville Heritage in the first round of the playoffs. In the second round of the playoffs, Carroll and Allen played a memorable game at Cowboys Stadium that went to two overtimes and ended with a Carroll victory 35–34. In the third round, Carroll was upset by Arlington Bowie 45–21. In the 2011 season, Southlake Carroll became the district champion, with a record of 10–0. The Dragons defeated Plano East, Cedar Hill, Arlington Bowie, Arlington Martin and Dallas Skyline to advance to the 5A Division 1 state championship game against Fort Bend Hightower, where the Dragons won 36–29 to claim the 2011 state championship.

The Carroll Dragon football team competed in district 7-6A in the 2014 season and finished with a 10-0 regular season record. The Dragons were ranked in the top 10 AP poll throughout the season and climbed to #2 overall at the conclusion of regular season play, with defending 5A division I state champion Allen Eagles at #1.

Cross Country
Girls Cross Country
2000, 2005, 2006, 2007, 2011, 2012, 2013, 2019
The Lady Dragon cross country team has won 8 UIL state titles since 2000. They tied the state record in 2012 with 32 points. They qualified for the state meet 17 years in a row, and have had 26 individual state medalists (top 10 in the state) and two individual state champions, Brooke Upshaw in 2005 and Jessa Vacek in 2000. They also claimed 13 regional and 13 district titles. The Lady Dragons have qualified for the Nike Cross National meet in Portland, Oregon, in 9 out of the 10 years it has been held.

Boys Cross Country
2006, 2007, 2011, 2012, 2013, 2014, 2019, 2020, 2021, and 2022

The boys' cross country team won UIL 5A/6A state titles.  setting the state record in 2011 with 20 points.  They have qualified for the state meet 12 times and during that time have 24 state medalists (top 10) and two-time state champion Colby Lowe (2006, 2007).

Tennis
Tennis
1996, 1998, 2016, 2022
Southlake has produced seven individual tennis state champions, Doug Fike (1996), Justin Hunter (1998), Arman Dave (2016), a doubles team consisting of Matt Landers and Alec Reusche (2016), and another consisting of Brennan Becicka and Rosabella Andrade (2022). In 1998, Hunter also won the school's only high school national championship. Corey Aldridge is the current head coach and was named Texas Division High School Coach of Year by USPTA in 2016.

Swimming and Diving
Boys Swimming And Diving Texas UIL State Championships
 2001, 2002, 2011, 2012, 2013, 2014, 2015, 2016, 2017, 2018, 2019, 2022.  (12x's)
The Carroll Dragon boys swim team won the state championship in 2001 and 2002 as a 4A school, while the girls team finished second in both years.

Girls Swimming And Diving Texas UIL State Championships
 2012, 2013, 2019, 2020, 2022. (5x's)
  
The 2012 & 2020 Lady Dragon swim/dive teams were crowned the NISCA Power-Point Dual Meet Overall National Champions.
The 2016, 2017 and 2018 Dragon Boys' swim/dive teams were crowned the NISCA Power-Point Dual Meet Public School National Champions.

Southlake Carroll boys' and girls' have "swept" the Texas State Meet four times since 2012, with both teams claiming Team State Championships in the same year: 2012, 2013, 2019 and 2022.   Since 2010, with over 250 HS Swim/Dive Teams in the largest Texas UIL Class, Southlake Carroll's Boys and Girls have finished in the Top 3 at The Texas State Swim/Dive Championships, 22 of 26 times, making Southlake Carroll arguably the #1 HS Swim/Dive Program in the entire State of Texas.

Soccer

In 2013, Carroll Dragon Soccer team's head coach, Greg Oglesby, was a recipient for the 2013 National Coaches of the Year Award by the National Federation of State High School Association (NFHS). In 2014, the Lady Dragons Soccer team ranked No. 2 in their 5A division. The Lady Dragons won the 5A State Championship in 2008 and the 6A State Championship in 2019 and 2022.

Hockey
Hockey
2010, 2015, 2018
The Carroll Dragons hockey team has won two state championships, one in 2010 under the coaching of Tom Yockey, and another in 2018 with Knute Anderson as coach. They also won the 2015 City Championship with Tyler Culp as their captain.

Wrestling
Wrestling
 2017 UIL 6A State Boys Runner-ups
 10X Boys District Champions (since 2012)
 Individual UIL State Champions: 
2021 & 2022 Bayley Trang
2018 Cameron Haddock
2015 Michael Basler
2008 Stephen McPeek
2007 Robert Prigmore

Fine arts
Carroll Senior High School/High School offers four concert bands, three jazz bands, the Dragon Marching Band, five concert choirs, one show choir, the 2011 State Champion Emerald Belles drill team, Color Guard, and the Carroll Theatre program.

Band
In 2007, 2010, 2014, 2018, 2020, and 2021, Carroll Senior High’s Jazz Orchestra was selected as a finalist in the Essentially Ellington Competition. The Jazz Orchestra was also selected to perform at the 2014 Texas Music Educators Association Convention as the Invited High School Jazz Ensemble.

The Dragon marching band has competed in the UIL State Marching Contest 15 times since its inception, winning twice. In 2019, the band competed in the Bands of America St. Louis Super Regional Championship, where they advanced to BOA finals for the first time in school history and placed 9th overall out of 69 competing bands. Since then, the band has earned multiple BOA regional and super regional finalist placements. In 2021, the band was a finalist at the UIL 6A State Marching Band Contest, and in 2022 was a BOA Grand Nationals finalist.

The Carroll concert band program consists of four concert bands: Symphonic Winds Green, Symphonic Winds White, Wind Ensemble, and Wind Symphony. Every four years from the mid-1990s until the 2010s, the Wind Symphony participated in an exchange program with music students from Tring school, England, whereby students from Tring would visit Texas during the fall, and the Carroll students would visit England the following summer. The concert bands compete regularly in the South Coast Music Festival in Corpus Christi, Texas, and in the UIL concert band competition. In June 2016, the 2015-16 Carroll Wind Symphony participated in The "Texas Bands Exhibition" concert at Carnegie Hall in New York City.

Debate
Carroll Senior High's debate team is currently coached by Anthony Brown.  The Southlake debate team has won 18 state championships total, with wins in Foreign Extemp, Congress, Lincoln Douglas, World Schools Debate, and Dramatic Interp. Some notable "Slake" debaters include Azhar Hussain, winner of the 2015 Tournament of Champions national tournament in Congressional Debate, Emma Lin, who was ranked 11th in Congressional debate in 2016, and Sahaj Singh, one of two freshman to qualify for the TOC in the 2015-2016 season in Congress, Tarun Ratnasabapathy who tied for the most TOC bids in LD history, and Southlake SM's who was the most notable team on the 2016 PF circuit.

Carroll Medical Academy
The Carroll Medical Academy (CMA) is Carroll ISD's accelerated math and science program for students interested in pursuing a career in the medical field. CMA began in 2004 and has been under the direction of Sherry Martin since 2005. The program centers around giving students the opportunity to take advanced science courses and participate in medical internships in the Dallas-Fort Worth area. Students involved in Carroll Medical Academy also participate in community service.

Notable alumni
Tyler Alexander, MLB pitcher for Detroit Tigers
 Evan Brown, NFL player
 Kris Brown, retired kicker for Houston Texans
 Max Boydston, former All-American for Oklahoma Sooners and retired NFL player
 Scott Chandler, NFL tight end
 Quinn Ewers,  quarterback for the Texas Longhorns
 Lindsay Jones, voice actor
 John Curtiss, MLB pitcher for Tampa Bay Rays
 Chase Daniel, quarterback for Los Angeles Chargers
 Riley Dodge, Head Football Coach at Carroll Senior High School
 Justin Drescher, former long snapper for New Orleans Saints
 Garrett Hartley,  NFL kicker, Super Bowl XLIV champion
 Kenny Hill, previous quarterback for TCU Horned Frogs
 Lil'Jordan Humphrey, NFL wide receiver
 Aaron Luna, former outfielder and 2nd baseman for Rice University and St. Louis Cardinals
 Greg McElroy, retired quarterback for New York Jets, led Alabama to national championship, College Football Analyst for ESPN
 Tre' Newton, former running back for Texas Longhorns
 Ross Stripling, MLB pitcher for Toronto Blue Jays
 Plastique Tiara, also known as Duc Tran Nguyen, a Vietnamese drag queen who was on the 11th season of RuPaul’s Drag Race.
Hailey Hernandez, diver competing in the women's 3 meter springboard at the 2020 Summer Olympics.
 David Woodley, 2021 World Series of Poker Online Circuit Champion. 2 time 2022 World Series Of Poker Online Circuit Champion.

References

External links 
 
 Official Carroll Dragons Athletics website
 Official Choir website
 

Public high schools in Tarrant County, Texas
Public high schools in Texas
1919 establishments in Texas
Educational institutions established in 1919